Mount Fitzgerald is a volcanic peak in southwestern British Columbia, Canada, located  east of Rivers Inlet and  east of Mount Silverthrone.

Mount Fitzgerald lies on the northern rim of a circular volcanic depression in the Pacific Ranges of the Coast Mountains called the Silverthrone Caldera.

See also
 List of volcanoes in Canada
 Volcanology of Canada
 Volcanology of Western Canada

References

 

Two-thousanders of British Columbia
Volcanoes of British Columbia
Pacific Ranges